The abbreviation MAUP may refer to:
Modifiable areal unit problem
Interregional Academy of Personnel Management (whose Ukrainian transliteration is often used in English)